Algoma Buffalo, formerly Buffalo, is a diesel-powered lake freighter acquired by Algoma Central Corporation in 2018. This vessel was built in 1978 by Bay Shipbuilding Company at their yard in Sturgeon Bay, Wisconsin for the American Steamship Company and included self-unloading technology. The vessel is currently in service.

Description

The vessel is powered by two  single-acting, two-stroke cycle, V-20 cylinder diesel engines. The engines were constructed by the Electro-Motive Division of the General Motors Corporation. The engines turn a controllable pitch propeller through Falk reduction gears. Buffalo is equipped with both a  bow thruster and a  stern thruster.

Algoma Buffalo is equipped with a  discharge boom capable of swinging 90° to either side of the ship and luffing to 18°.

History 
Buffalo was the seventh ship ordered by the American Shipping Company under Title XI of the United States' Merchant Marine Act of 1970. The program allowed U.S. shipping companies to construct new vessels or to modernize their existing fleet with government-guaranteed financing and tax deferred benefits. The vessel's keel was laid down by the Bay Shipbuilding Company at their yard in Sturgeon Bay, Wisconsin on 12 May 1977 with the yard number 721. The lake freighter was launched on 16 March 1978 and completed on 23 September 1978. The vessel was named for Buffalo, New York, the site of the American Shipping Company's headquarters.

Entering service in 1978 and registered in Wilmington, Delaware, Buffalo was used to transport bulk cargoes, such as iron ore pellets, coal, limestone and gypsum throughout the Great Lakes and St. Lawrence Seaway. In 1983, ownership of the lake freighter was transferred to the Lawrence Steamship Company, which kept the ship's registration in Wilmington. In 1989, the Connecticut Bank and Trust took over ownership of the vessel.

On 16 September 1990, Buffalo was passing the smaller tanker  in the harbor of Bay City, Michigan. The transfer hoses from the ship to shore became untethered and resulting in an explosion and burning fuel to spill into the water. Eleven crew members of Jupiter were injured and a twelfth missing and presumed dead.

In 1997, ownership of Buffalo returned to the Lawrence Steamship Company. In late 1997 Buffalo struck the Detroit River Light, a lighthouse located in Lake Erie that marks the entrance into the Detroit River. A  gash was torn across the bow. Buffalo began taking on water, but managed to proceed to the CSX coal dock in Toledo, Ohio. The lighthouse suffered minimal damage. Buffalo was sent for repairs at the Toledo shipyard. Damage to the bow was significant and in the subsequent United States Coast Guard investigation, human error by the ship's crew was given as the cause of the incident.

In late 2017 the ship was purchased by Algoma Central Corporation. The ship re-entered service in 2018 and the freighter was renamed Algoma Buffalo and re-registered to St. Catharines, Ontario. In Algoma service, the vessel is used to transport construction materials and road salt. In 2020, the vessel underwent repairs while laid up for the winter in Owen Sound, Ontario's harbour.

References

External links

 Article describing Jupiter explosion

1977 ships
Great Lakes freighters
Ships built in Sturgeon Bay, Wisconsin
Algoma Central Marine